Faces in Reflection is the third studio album by American keyboardist George Duke issued in 1974 on MPS Records. The album reached No. 31 on the Billboard Jazz Albums chart.

Overview
Faces in Reflection was produced by Balhard G. Falk.

Track listing

Personnel 
 George Duke – keyboards, pianos, vocals (2, 9)
 John Heard – bass
 Leon Ndugu Chancler – drums

Production 
 Baldhard G. Falk – producer, photography 
 Fred Borkgren – engineer
 Kerry McNabb – mixing 
 Heinz Bähr – design 
 Marcia Blackman – liner notes

References

1974 albums
George Duke albums
MPS Records albums